SageManifolds (following styling of SageMath) is an extension fully integrated into SageMath, to be used as a package for differential geometry and tensor calculus. The official page for the project is sagemanifolds.obspm.fr. It can be used on CoCalc.

SageManifolds deals with differentiable manifolds of arbitrary dimension. The basic objects are tensor fields and not tensor components in a given vector frame or coordinate chart. In other words, various charts and frames can be introduced on the manifold and a given tensor field can have representations in each of them.

An important class of treated manifolds is that of pseudo-Riemannian manifolds, among which Riemannian manifolds and Lorentzian manifolds, with applications to General Relativity. In particular, SageManifolds implements the computation of the Riemann curvature tensor and associated objects (Ricci tensor, Weyl tensor). SageManifolds can also deal with generic affine connections, not necessarily Levi-Civita ones.

Functionalities 

More documentation is on doc.sagemath.org/html/en/reference/manifolds/.

Free & Open Software 
As SageMath is, SageManifolds is a free and open source software based on the Python programming language. It is released under the GNU General Public License. To download and install SageManifolds, see here. It is more specifically GPL v2+ (meaning that a user may elect to use a licence higher than GPL version 2.)

Development 
Much of the source is on tickets at trac.sagemath.org.

There are GitHub repositories at github.com/sagemanifolds/SageManifolds.

Other links are provided at sagemanifolds.obspm.fr/contact.html.

Free mathematics software
Python (programming language) scientific libraries
Free software programmed in Python
Free educational software
Mathematical software